David W. Hermance (September 27, 1947 – November 25, 2006) was an American automotive engineer called the "American father of the Prius." According to Automotive News, Hermance was considered the top American executive for alternative fuel vehicles.

David Weston Hermance was born in Logansport, Indiana to Keith  Weston Hermance and Margaret "Peg" Johnstone Hermance.   David Hermance earned a Bachelor of Science degree in engineering from the General Motors Institute. He joined General Motors in 1965 and served in a variety of roles in the Vehicle Emissions Laboratory from 1971 to 1985. From 1985 to 1991, Hermance served as Department Head for Durability
Test Development at General Motors. He was a member of the Society of Automotive Engineers.

Toyota and hybrids

Hermance joined Toyota Technical Center (TTC) in 1991 as Senior Manager in Engine Evaluation, with responsibility for evaluating North American passenger car engines. In 1992, he was promoted to General Manager of the Powertrain Department in Gardena, California where he was responsible for the development of engine and drivetrain calibrations for the North American market.  His department tested many experimental designs including TRW's "Electro-Mechanical Transmission" that became the Hybrid Electric vehicle. 

At TTC, Hermance went on to become Executive Engineer for Advanced Technology Vehicles.  Widely considered the most knowledgeable person in the United States on the subject of hybrid vehicles, Hermance was responsible for advanced technology vehicle communication for the North American market and advanced technology vehicle emission regulatory activities in California.  He was recognized as an eloquent and persuasive spokesman, both in explaining to the public and regulators complex hybrid technology, its advantages and limitations, in lay terms, and with persuading Toyota that the American public would buy hybrid cars in large numbers only if performance and size were not sacrificed.

Interviewed in 2004, Hermance said his championing of the Prius was environmentally motivated, adding, "I'm convinced global warming is real, and that if we're not principally responsible, we're at least contributing to that."  In July 2006, Hermance testified before the United States House Committee on Government Reform on the topic:  "Hybrid Cars: Increasing Fuel Efficiency and Reducing Oil Dependence."

Death
Hermance was an avid pilot and flew his Russian Yak-55 aerobatic airplane regularly in aerobatic competition at the Intermediate level. Hermance died on November 25, 2006, while flying an Interavia E-3 off the California coast.  Engine failure is not believed to be the cause of the crash.

References

1947 births
2006 deaths
Aviators killed in aviation accidents or incidents in the United States
Kettering University alumni
American automotive engineers
Accidental deaths in California
20th-century American engineers
Victims of aviation accidents or incidents in 2006